Michael O'Sullivan (born 15 August 1990) is an Irish hurler who played as a full-forward for the Cork senior team.

Born in Minane Bridge, County Cork, O'Sullivan first played competitive hurling in his younger days and at school. He arrived on the inter-county scene at the age of nineteen when he first linked up with the Cork under-21 team, before later lining out with the intermediate side. He joined the senior panel for the 2012 National Hurling League.

O'Sullivan currently plays in the United States.

On 3 April 2014 it was announced that O'Sullivan had been dropped from Cork's championship panel.

Honours

Team

Cork
All-Ireland Intermediate Hurling Championship (1): 2014
Munster Intermediate Hurling Championship (1): 2014

References

1990 births
Living people
CIT hurlers
Tracton hurlers
Carrigdhoun hurlers
Cork inter-county hurlers